Puhudivula Grama Niladhari Division is a Grama Niladhari Division of the Medawachchiya Divisional Secretariat  of Anuradhapura District  of North Central Province, Sri Lanka .  It has Grama Niladhari Division Code 44.

Puhudivula is a surrounded by the Gonumeriyawa, Heerallugama, Ethakada, Lolugaswewa, Paranahalmillewa, Alagalla, Asikulam, Mahamylankulama and Kunchuttuwa  Grama Niladhari Divisions.

Demographics

Ethnicity 

The Puhudivula Grama Niladhari Division has a Sinhalese majority (100.0%) . In comparison, the Medawachchiya Divisional Secretariat (which contains the Puhudivula Grama Niladhari Division) has a Sinhalese majority (93.4%)

Religion 

The Puhudivula Grama Niladhari Division has a Buddhist majority (100.0%) . In comparison, the Medawachchiya Divisional Secretariat (which contains the Puhudivula Grama Niladhari Division) has a Buddhist majority (92.9%)

Grama Niladhari Divisions of Medawachchiya Divisional Secretariat

References